Yaylakent is a town (belde) in the Orta District, Çankırı Province, Turkey. Its population is 2,881 (2021). The town consists of 4 quarters: Hürriyet, Cumhuriyet, Inkılap and Kayılar.

References

Populated places in Orta District